The Canadian Amateur Championship (occasionally known as the Canadian Open Snooker Championship) is an annual snooker competition played in Canada and is the highest ranking amateur event in the country.

The competition was first established back in 1969 which was won by Paul Thornley. Alain Robidoux is the record championship holder with seven titles, one ahead of Kirk Stevens. Tom Finstad holds the record for reaching the most finals having reached eleven finals and won the championship three times. The championship is currently held by Vito Puopolo, who defeated Alan Whitfield 5–3 in the 2022 final.

Many former champions have gone on to play on the world tour such as Alain Robidoux, Kirk Stevens, Bob Chaperon, Jim Wych, Bill Werbeniuk and most notably Cliff Thorburn who won the competition in 1972, 1974, 1975, 1976, 1977 and 2001, eventually going on to become the first player in the modern era from outside the United Kingdom to win the World Snooker Championship in 1980.

Winners

Finalists

References

Snooker amateur competitions
Snooker in Canada
Recurring sporting events established in 1969
1969 establishments in Canada